Juan Manuel Concado (died May 14, 1989) was an Argentine art director. He designed the sets for more than ninety films during the Golden Age of Argentine Cinema.

Selected filmography
 Dancing (1933)
 Mother Gloria (1941)
 Story of a Poor Young Man (1942)
 Sensational Kidnapping (1942)
 Captain Poison (1943)
 The Dance of Fortune (1944)
 The Two Rivals (1944)
 Lucrecia Borgia (1947)
 Modern Husbands (1948)
 A Story of the Nineties (1949)

References

Bibliography
 Mónica Landro & Marta Speroni. Cine sonoro argentino, Volume 2. El Calafate Editores, 2005.

External links

Year of birth unknown
1989 deaths
Argentine art directors
People from Buenos Aires